Georgia Miller may refer to:

 Sasha Miller (born 1933), née Georgia Miller, American fantasy author
 Georgia Fudge, also known as Georgia Miller, American bodybuilder
 Georgia Miller, one of the main characters of the American TV show Ginny & Georgia